Argentiniceras is an extinct genus of cephalopod belonging to the Ammonite subclass. It belongs to the class Cephalopoda. Its fossils were found in Russia, Yemen, India, Mediterranean, Canada and South America.

References

External links 
 Argentiniceras on The Paleobiology Database, information about fossil sites of A. mintaqi and A. longiceps

Ammonitida genera
Cretaceous ammonites
Perisphinctoidea
Ammonites of South America
Cretaceous Argentina
Cretaceous Chile
Berriasian life